Proverbs 27 is the 27th chapter of the Book of Proverbs in the Hebrew Bible or the Old Testament of the Christian Bible. The book is a compilation of several wisdom literature collections, with the heading in 1:1 may be intended to regard Solomon as the traditional author of the whole book, but the dates of the individual collections are difficult to determine, and the book probably obtained its final shape in the post-exilic period. This chapter is the last part of the fifth collection of the book, so-called "the Second Solomonic Collection."

Text
The original text is written in Hebrew language. This chapter is divided into 27 verses.

Textual witnesses
Some early manuscripts containing the text of this chapter in Hebrew are of the Masoretic Text, which includes the Aleppo Codex (10th century), and Codex Leningradensis (1008). 

There is also a translation into Koine Greek known as the Septuagint, made in the last few centuries BC; some extant ancient manuscripts of this version include Codex Vaticanus (B; B; 4th century), Codex Sinaiticus (S; BHK: S; 4th century), and Codex Alexandrinus (A; A; 5th century).

Analysis
This chapter belongs to a further collection of Solomonic proverbs, transmitted and
edited by royal scribes during the reign of Hezekiah, comprising Proverbs  25–29. Based on differences in style and subject-matter there could be two originally separate collections: 
 Proverbs 25–27: characterized by many similes and the 'earthy' tone
 Proverbs 28–29: characterized by many antithetical sayings and the predominantly 'moral and religious' tone (cf. Proverbs 10–15)

The New King James Version adopts verse 7 as a sub-heading for this chapter, reflecting the argument from Methodist minister Arno Gaebelein that this section represents "instructions given to Solomon". Verses 23 to 27 are distinct and commend the life of a shepherd "as providing the best and most enduring kind of wealth".

Verse 1
Do not boast about tomorrow,
for you do not know what a day may bring forth.
"A day": Perowne notes that the Septuagint refers to "the day" (hē epiousa), meaning the next day, but he considers "a day", meaning " a future day", to be a preferable translation.

Verse 20
Sheol and Abaddon are never satisfied,
and never satisfied are the eyes of man.
"Sheol" or "hell" (KJV, NKJV, etc.) is depicted as 'a monster with a voracious appetite for human victims' (cf. Proverbs 1:12; 30:16). Human desires and ambition are just as insatiable and may also be as ruthless.
"Abaddon": or "destruction" (KJV, NKJV, etc.).

See also

Related Bible parts: Exodus 22, Leviticus 25, Proverbs 10, Proverbs 15, Proverbs 25

References

Sources

External links
 Jewish translations:
 Mishlei - Proverbs - Chapter 27 (Judaica Press) translation [with Rashi's commentary] at Chabad.org
 Christian translations:
 Online Bible at GospelHall.org (ESV, KJV, Darby, American Standard Version, Bible in Basic English)
 Book of Proverbs Chapter 27 King James Version
  Various versions

27